Gandabar is a village in Bala Velayat Rural District, in the Central District of Kashmar County, Razavi Khorasan Province, Iran. At the 2006 census, its population was 172, in 43 families.

References 

Populated places in Kashmar County